The Altagamma Foundation (in ) is the Italian luxury brands committee composed of companies in the fields of design, fashion, food, jewellery, automobiles, and hospitality.

History 

The Altagamma Foundation was created in 1992 by Italian luxury brands including Alessi, Les Copains, Ferragamo, Ferré, Zegna and Versace.

In 2012, the Foundation finalized the financing for the transformation of the Galleria Vittorio Emanuele II.

In 2015, Altagamma launched the prize Premio Giovani Imprese to reward young luxury companies and offer them a one-year membership into the Foundation. The Foundation also launched a new cursus to develop luxury craftsmanship in Italy.

In December 2019, Matteo Lunelli, president of Ferrari Trento, was named president of Altagamma for the 2020-2022 period.

Description 

The Altagamma Foundation commissions global research studies on behalf of its members, with the goal to protect the luxury reputation of its members. It fulfills a similar function as the French Comité Colbert.

Further reading

References

External links 
 Official website

Italian brands
Brand management
Luxury brands